The Umutina are an indigenous ethnic group from the Mato Grosso region of eastern Brazil. They are a member of the Bororo language group.

References
isa.org.br

Indigenous peoples in Brazil
Indigenous peoples of Eastern Brazil